Larocque is a French language surname found primarily in Quebec, Nova Scotia (formerly Acadia), Prince Edward Island, Ontario, and the New England region of the United States.

There are four main branches of the Larocque surname in North America:
 Philibert Couillaud dit Roquebrune (1641–1700), is known to be from the diocese of Nevers in France.  Because his marriage record was never found his parents name and location in France remain unknown. He was said to be a member of the Carignan-Salières Regiment. The regiment landed in Quebec in 1665. He was sent primarily to defend New France from the Iroquois, and eventually settled down in Contrecoeur, Quebec. He married Catherine De La Porte dit St Georges in 1675 at Contrecoeur. The couple had 11 children in all. Members of this branch often have the surnames Larocque, Larock, Rock, Roquebrune, Rocquebrune, Rocque, Rockbrune, Rockburn or Couillaud. 
 Guillaume Larocque, from the diocese of Albi, France, married Jeanne Boivin in Montréal, Quebec in 1717.
 Antoine Larocque, writer for King Louis XIV, was from Trie, France. He married Catherine Guillemot in 1752.
 Francois Larocque, from France, married Marguerite Caplan about 1725.

List of persons with the surname
Andy LaRocque (born 1962), or Anders Allhage, musician from Sweden
Charles La Rocque (1809–1875), Canadian Roman Catholic priest
Denis Larocque (born 1967), professional hockey player
François-Antoine Larocque, Sr. (1753–1792), businessman and political figure in Lower Canada
François-Antoine Larocque (1784–1869), Quebec businessman
Gary LaRocque, former Minor League Baseball player and manager
Gédéon Larocque (1831–1903), physician and political figure in Quebec
Gene La Rocque (born 1918), retired rear admiral of the United States Navy
Greg LaRocque is a noted comic book illustrator for Exiled Studios
Holly Larocque, Canadian actress and theatre performer
Jacques Larocque, Canadian saxophonist, arranger, music educator, and university administrator
Jocelyne Larocque (born May 19, 1988), American women’s ice hockey player
Joey LaRocque (born 1986), American football linebacker
Joseph La Rocque (1808–1887), Canadian Roman Catholic priest, professor, and bishop
Joseph Larocque (attorney) (1831–1908), New York City lawyer and president of the New York City Bar Association
Leigh Larocque (born 1934), American Republican politician
Mario Larocque (born 1978), Canadian professional ice hockey defenceman
Michel Larocque (ice hockey), (born 1976), professional ice hockey goaltender
Michel Larocque (1952–1992), Canadian professional ice hockey goaltender
Paul LaRocque (1846–1926), Canadian Roman Catholic priest
Rod La Rocque (1898–1969), American actor
Sam LaRocque (1863–1933), former professional baseball second baseman
 Bishop Eugene P. La Rocque (1927-2018)
 Dr. Raymond Denis La Rocque (FRCS)
 Jocelyn J. La Rocque (born 1992) 5X CIS National Women's Basketball Champion Windsor Lancers

See also
Rocque

References